Danylo Kyrylovych Zabolotny (1866 in Chobotarka, Podolia Governorate – 1929) was a Ukrainian epidemiologist and the founder of the world's first research department of epidemiology. In 1927, he published one of the first texts in his field, Fundamentals of Epidemiology.

Zabolotny conducted groundbreaking research on a number of infectious diseases, including cholera, diphtheria, dysentery, plague, syphilis, and typhus, as well as on gangrene.

External links
https://web.archive.org/web/20051128175106/http://ukrweekly.com/Archive/1996/519609.shtml

1866 births
1929 deaths
People from Vinnytsia Oblast
People from Olgopolsky Uyezd
Central Executive Committee of the Soviet Union members
Ukrainian epidemiologists
Ukrainian biologists
Soviet infectious disease physicians
Odesa University alumni
Taras Shevchenko National University of Kyiv alumni
Academic staff of the Odesa National Medical University
Full Members of the USSR Academy of Sciences
Presidents of the National Academy of Sciences of Ukraine
Recipients of the Order of St. Anna, 3rd class
Recipients of the Order of Saint Stanislaus (Russian), 2nd class
Soviet bacteriologists